Rampersad, also spelt Ramprasad or Rampersaud, is a surname common in Trinidad and Tobago, Guyana, Suriname, the Caribbean, Fiji, South Africa, and Mauritius. The name is common among Caribbean Hindus, but also among others as a result of ethnic mixing. It is also common among many Christians as well. Many people of this surname have migrated to the United States and Canada as well. Sundar Popo wrote a song called Rampersad.

The name derives from the Indian name Ramprasad, which is a common name among Bhojpuri (a Hindi dialect) speaking areas of the states of Bihar and Uttar Pradesh of northern and eastern India. Prasad in Sanskrit means refers to an offering of food given to the idol (murti) of a god. Although the word is pronounced in Sanskrit as Prasad, the pronunciation changes in Bhojpuri to Parsad or Persad.  This is reflected in the Caribbean name as, from 1834 to 1917, indentured plantation workers from chiefly Bhojpur were dispersed far and wide across the world including the Caribbean, Suriname, Fiji and Mauritius. In India it is used as a first name, but the descendants of the indentured laborers in the European colonies used their fathers' first name as their surname.

People of this given name
Rampersad Parasram

People of this surname

 Andre Rampersad, a Trinidadian footballer
 Arnold Rampersad, an American biographer and literary critic.
 Capil Rampersad, a West Indies cricketer.
 Kris Rampersad, a writer, researcher, lecturer, journalist, publisher, activist and advocate from Trinidad and Tobago.

References

Hindu given names
Surnames
Indian surnames
Surnames of Indian origin
Hindustani-language surnames
Hindu surnames
Indo-Caribbean
Indo-Guyanese people
Indian diaspora in Fiji
Indian diaspora in Trinidad and Tobago
Indian diaspora in Suriname
Indian diaspora in South Africa
Indian diaspora in Mauritius
Bihari-language surnames